Boris Aleksandrovich Ruchyev (official surname: Krivoshchyokov) (1913—1973) was a Soviet Russian poet, most of whose life and work was related to the city of Magnitogorsk. He is an author of about 30 books of poetry and a recipient of several state awards and decorations.

After a not very successful start as a young poet, in 1930 he decides to become a construction worker at Magnitostroy, the constriction project of the Magnitogorsk Iron and Steel Works. While working there, he continued his poetic works, now at the pen name, Boris Ruchyov. Soon he started gaining recognition. In 1937 he was falsely accused of a counter-revolutionary crime  and in 1938 sentenced to 10 years of Gulag labor camps in accordance with Article 58. He served his time in Sevvostlag. He is one of the poets thought to be the author of the "unofficial Gulag anthem", Vaninsky port.  After the release he was forbidden to settle in major cities. In 1956 he was rehabilitated, in 1957 he was restored in the rights of a poet and returned to the city of his youth, Magnitogorsk. After a while he became a recognized Soviet poet.

Awards and recognition
1973: Order of the October Revolution
 1969: Honorary citizen of Magnitogorsk
1967: in literature 
1963, 1967, Order of the Red Banner of Labour

References

1913 births
1973 deaths
Russian male poets
Soviet poets
Soviet male writers
20th-century Russian male writers
Gulag detainees
Soviet rehabilitations